Velostat, also known as Linqstat, is a packaging material made of a polymeric foil (polyolefins) impregnated with carbon black to make it electrically conductive. It is used for the protection of items or devices that are susceptible to damage from electrostatic discharge. It was developed by Custom Materials, now part of 3M. Velostat is a U.S. registered trademark (4,964,564) of Desco Industries Inc.  Desco Industries purchased the assets of the 3M Static Control business on January 2, 2015.

Due to its properties of changing its resistance with either flexing or pressure it has become popular with hobbyists for making inexpensive sensors for microcontroller experiments. One example of this is to make shoes which light up when the wearer takes a step. Since the resistance in the circuit is reduced when pressure is applied, this reading can indicate when weight is applied or removed from the shoes.

See also
 ESD materials
 Force-sensing resistor (FSR)

References

External links
 Example (in German)

Packaging materials